Sơn Thủy is a commune (xã) in the Lệ Thủy District, Quảng Bình Province, North Central Coast region of Vietnam. This commune is located near Ho Chi Minh Highway. Hanoi–Saigon Railway crosses this commune.

Communes of Quảng Bình province